The forest honeyeater (Microptilotis montanus) is a species of bird in the family Meliphagidae. 
It is found throughout New Guinea.
Its natural habitats are subtropical or tropical moist lowland forest and subtropical or tropical moist montane forest.

References

forest honeyeater
Birds of New Guinea
forest honeyeater
Taxonomy articles created by Polbot